Sterling Township is one of the sixteen townships of Brown County, Ohio, United States. The 2010 census records 4,427 people in the township.

Geography
The Township is located in the northern extension of the county and borders the following townships:
Perry Township - north
Green Township - east
Pike Township - south
Williamsburg Township, Clermont County - southwest
Jackson Township, Clermont County - northwest

Part of the village of Mount Orab is located in southeastern Sterling Township.

Name and history
It is the only Sterling Township statewide.

Sterling Township was established in 1824 from land given by Perry and Pike townships.

Government
The township is governed by a three-member board of trustees, who are elected in November of odd-numbered years to a four-year term beginning on the following January 1. Two are elected in the year after the presidential election and one is elected in the year before it. There is also an elected township fiscal officer, who serves a four-year term beginning on April 1 of the year after the election, which is held in November of the year before the presidential election. Vacancies in the fiscal officership or on the board of trustees are filled by the remaining trustees.

References

External links
County website

Townships in Brown County, Ohio
Townships in Ohio
1824 establishments in Ohio
Populated places established in 1824